"Hold the Line" is a song by American rock band Toto from their 1978 eponymous debut studio album. Written by the band's keyboardist David Paich, the lead vocals on the song were performed by Bobby Kimball.

"Hold the Line" was released as the band's debut single and lead single from the Toto album on October 2, 1978, by Columbia Records. It became a huge hit for the band, reaching number five on the Billboard Hot 100 and number 14 on the UK Singles Chart.

Content
Jeff Porcaro, the band's drummer, gave a definition for the song:

Hold the Line' was a perfect example of what people will describe as your heavy metal chord guitar licks, your great triplet A-notes on the piano, your 'Sly'-hot-fun-in-the-summertime groove, all mishmashed together with a boy from New Orleans singing... and it really crossed over a lot of lines."

Background and writing

Keyboardist David Paich noted that the song was relatively easy to develop. He began with the piano riff, which would become the song's intro and chorus. After toying with the piano riff one night, he started singing "Hold the line, love isn't always on time", and found the lyric to be a suitable fit. The verses were subsequently finished two hours later.

Jeff Porcaro on "Hold the Line", in a 1988 interview with Modern Drummer:

"That was me trying to play like Sly Stone's original drummer, Greg Errico, who played drums on "Hot Fun In The Summertime." The hi-hat is doing triplets, the snare drum is playing 2 and 4 backbeats, and the bass drum is on 1 and the & of 2. That 8th note on the second beat is an 8th-note triplet feel, pushed. When we did the tune, I said, "Gee, this is going to be a heavy four-on-the-floor rocker, but we want a Sly groove." The triplet groove of the tune was David's writing. It was taking the Sly groove and meshing it with a harder rock caveman approach."

The song is in the key of F# minor  and features a guitar solo after the second chorus which is played by guitarist Steve Lukather featuring several techniques like bendings, alternate picking, vibrato and harmonies. 

Several of the band members recall hearing "Hold the Line" for the first time on the radio:

"I flipped the first time I heard myself on the radio. My mom called me up and said, "Turn on KLOS." It was the song "Hold the Line," and I started running around the house in my underwear, screaming, "I'm on the radio!" My wife was cracking up. It was just a thrill." (Steve Lukather, Guitar Player magazine, April 1984)

Bobby Kimball had a similar experience when he heard Toto for the very first time on the radio:
"I was asleep, I had my alarm clock set for noon because we were gonna do something in the studio, some promo and when the alarm came on there was the radio and "Hold The Line" was playing. And my room was totally black and I was looking for the telephone and I called Paich and I heard him scream, he was living over there with his girlfriend and he was screaming around and falling over trying to get to the radio."

Reception
Cash Box said it has a "simple emphatic piano part, heavy surging guitars, pleasant turns, fine singing and strong chorus."  Billboard said that "Kimball's exciting vocals and the scorching instrumentals highlight this tune that also boasts a scorching mix and a solid hook."

Classic Rock History critic Brian Kachejian rated it as Toto's 2nd greatest song, saying that "The song’s mesmerizing opening lick became of the most eagerly learned piano runs that all pianist had to learn instantly."

Live performances
"Hold the Line" has been a live staple at Toto shows. Steve Lukather played the song live with Ringo Starr & His All-Starr Band during tours in 2012 and 2022. Bobby Kimball has performed the song on all of his solo tours since 2009.

Personnel

Toto
Bobby Kimball – lead and backing vocals
Steve Lukather – electric guitars, backing vocals
Steve Porcaro – keyboards
David Paich – piano, backing vocals
David Hungate – bass
Jeff Porcaro – drums
Lenny Castro – percussion

Charts and certifications

Weekly charts

Year-end charts

Certifications

Cover versions

In 1979, Millie Jackson included a version of the song on her Live & Uncensored album, recorded live at the Roxy in Los Angeles.

In 1981, Bosnian-born Serbian singer Zdravko Čolić released a cover version of this song in the Serbian language, with lyrics "Oktobar je, počinje sezona kiša" ("This is October, the rain season begins"). Belgian blues band Blue Blot covered the song on their album Where Do We Go.

In 2018, German metal band Bonfire covered the song on the album Legends.

British heavy metal band Saxon covered the song on their 2021 covers album Inspirations.

References

1978 songs
1978 debut singles
Toto (band) songs
Songs written by David Paich
Columbia Records singles
Number-one singles in South Africa